Something About You is the third studio album by the recording artist Angela Bofill, released in 1981. This was her first direct release through Arista Records, with Narada Michael Walden as producer and Clive Davis as executive.

Between the releases of Angel of the Night and Something About You, Bofill left GRP Records and joined Arista, which distributed GRP at the time, hoping to expand on her crossover success. In spite of the controversies surrounding Bofill and GRP, the album managed to sell, but with less success than her first two albums.

In 2002, Something About You was digitally remastered and re-released on Arista Records with extra tracks.

Track listing
"Something About You" (Allee Willis, John Lewis Parker, Robert Wright)
"Break It To Me Gently" (Doug Frank, Doug James)
"On and On" (Alfred McCrary, Linda McCrary)
"Tropical Love" (Jeff Cohen, Lisa Walden, Narada Michael Walden)
"You Should Know By Now" (Bunny Hull, Earl Klugh)
"Only Love" (Angela Bofill)
"Holdin' Out for Love" (Cynthia Weil, Tom Snow)
"Stop, Look, Listen (To Your Heart)" (Linda Creed, Thom Bell)  
"I Do Love You" (Allee Willis, Narada Michael Walden)  
"Three Blind Mice" (Public domain)  
"Time to Say Goodbye" (Angela Bofill)

Bonus tracks released with the 2002 remastered edition
"Never Wanna Be Without Your Love" - (with Narada Michael Walden)
"Esperando Al Amor" Produced by   Dave Grusin and Larry Rosen
"Love Light" Produced by Dave Grusin and Larry Rosen
"Rhythm of Your Mind"

Personnel
Angela Bofill - lead and backing vocals
Narada Michael Walden - drums, piano
Randy Jackson, Rusty Allen - bass guitar
Corrado Rustici, Earl Klugh, Joaquin Liévano - guitar
Tower of Power - horns
Paulinho Da Costa - percussion
Frank Martin - keyboards, synthesizer, Rhodes piano
Patrick Cowley, Greg Levias - synthesizer
Marc Russo - saxophone
Wayne Wallace - trombone
Greg Adams, Mic Gillette - trumpet
Larry Schneider - flute
Andy Narell - steel drums
Jim Gilstrap, John Lehman, Myrna Matthews, Scherrie Payne, Vicki Randle - backing vocals
Michael Gibbs - conductor, string arrangements
Clive Davis - executive producer

Charts

Weekly charts

Year-end charts

Singles

References

External links
 Angela Bofill - Something About You at Discogs

1981 albums
Angela Bofill albums
Arista Records albums
Albums produced by Narada Michael Walden
Albums produced by Clive Davis
Albums with cover art by Mick Rock